Berlin Falling is a 2017 German thriller film directed by Ken Duken. It tells the story of a retired soldier who picks up a mysterious hitchhiker.

Plot 
A terrorist plans a brutal attack in the middle of Christmas celebrations in Berlin. He highjacks a car outside Berlin, forcing the driver to take him to the center of the city so he can carry out the attack.

Cast 
 Tom Wlaschiha as Andreas
 Ken Duken as Frank
  as Okan
  as Claudia

References

External links 

2017 films
2017 thriller films
German thriller films
2010s German films
2010s German-language films